Trichopiezia stenotrachela is a species of beetles in the family Carabidae, the only species in the genus Trichopiezia.

References

Monotypic Carabidae genera
Lebiinae